Little Texas is an unincorporated community in southwestern Southampton County, Virginia, United States. It lies at an elevation of 75 feet (23 m).

References

Unincorporated communities in Southampton County, Virginia
Unincorporated communities in Virginia